Piankh was a High Priest of Amun during the 21st Dynasty.

Chronological and genealogical position
While the High Priest of Amun Piankh (or Payankh) has been assumed to be a son-in-law of Herihor and his heir to the Theban office of the High Priest of Amun, recent studies by Karl Jansen-Winkeln of the surviving temple inscriptions and monumental works by Herihor and Piankh in Upper Egypt imply that Piankh was actually Herihor's predecessor.

Piankh held a number of official positions including High Priest of Amun, King's scribe, King's son of Kush, Overseer of the  foreign countries to the South, overseer of the granaries and commander of the archers of the whole of [Upper] Egypt. He was succeeded in office by either Herihor or his son Pinedjem.

Family
The identity of Piankh's wife has not been established beyond doubt. In the Temple of Luxor there is a graffito of which only rudimentary traces of the beginning of her name have survived. These have been interpreted as either an "h" (Gardiner's Sign List V28, supporting Hrere) or as "ndjm" (Gardiner's Sign List M29). The latter solution would favour a model in which Piankh was married to a lady Nodjmet. Recently it has been argued that there were actually two ladies called Nodjmet: the first one, Nodjmet A, the wife of Piankh and mother of Herihor; the second one, Nodjmet B, the wife of Herihor.   
Whereas the identity of his wife remains uncertain, it is beyond doubt that he had a son called Pinedjem.

Military activity
In year 10 of the Whm Mswt Piankh, in his position as Viceroy of Kush, led an army into Nubia with the apparent aim to 'meet' a certain Pinehesy, probably the former Viceroy of Kush. Some ten years earlier, just before the start of the Whm mswt, Pinehesy had been chased out of the Thebaid, following his role in suppressing the High Priest of Amun Amenhotep. It is believed that since then he lived in Nubia as an enemy of the state. Although it is often postulated that it was the aim of this expedition to fight Pinehesy, this is by no means certain.

The sources are actually ambiguous on this point and the political climate may well have changed over the years. There is some evidence that at this time Piankh may no longer have been a loyal servant of Ramesses XI, which allows for the possibility that he was secretly negotiating with Pinehesy, possibly even plotting against the reigning king.

E. Wente wrote: "One has the impression that the viceroy and his Nubian troops were loyalists, for the remarks made by his opponent Piankh in letter No. 301 are quite disparaging of the pharaoh, Ramesses XI." In this letter, better known as LRL no. 21, Piankh remarks: 
{{cquote|As for Pharaoh, l.p.h., how shall he reach this land? And of whom is Pharaoh, l.p.h., superior still?}}
In the same letter and two others (LRL no. 34 and no. 35) Piankh gives the order to the Scribe of the Necropolis Tjaroy (=Dhutmose), Nodjmet and a certain Payshuuben to secretly arrest and question two Medjay policemen about certain things they had apparently said:

It has been argued that, given Piankh's prominent position at the time, the secrecy can only have concerned the king.Jennifer Palmer, Birmingham Egyptology Journal 2014.2, 10-11  If this is correct, it follows that the political situation of the time must have been very complex. Unfortunately, due to the very limited nature of the sources, the exact relationships between the three main protagonists, Piankh, Pinehesy and Ramesses XI remain far from clear. Some scholars believe that the Nubian campaign was part of an ongoing power struggle between the High Priest of Amun and the Viceroy of Kush. However, it is equally possible that Piankh came to the rescue of Pinehesy against some common enemy. The verb often translated as "to attack" only means "to meet/ to go to". In fact, neither the aim of the expedition nor its outcome are beyond doubt. It has also been argued that shortly afterwards Piankh disappeared off the stage with the Viceroy Pinehesy being reinvested in his former position as Viceroy, which would only be possible with the consent of Ramesses XI, either willingly or not.

Piankh and the Theban Necropolis
It seems that, under Piankh's pontificate, a beginning was made with locating and opening old tombs, either with the aim of protecting them against tomb violation or in order to use their buried treasures to finance affairs of the state. Eventually the priests of Amun scoured the valleys to find tombs; tombs and mummies were stripped of valuables, rewrapped and placed in group graves (caches).

References

Further reading
 Morris L. Bierbrier, Hrere, Wife of the High Priest Paiankh, JNES 32 (1973), 311
 Gerard P.F. Broekman, The founders of the twenty-first dynasty and their family relationships, GM 191 (2002), 11-18
 Arno Egberts, Piankh, Herihor, Dhutmose and Butehamun: a fresh look at O. Cairo CG 25744 and 25745, GM 160 (1997), 23-25
 Jeremy Goldberg, Was Piankh the Son of Herihor After All?, GM 174 (2000), 49-58
 Steven R.W. Gregory, Piankh and Herihor: Art, Ostraca, and Accession in Perspective, Birmingham Egyptology Journal 2013, 1: 5-18
 Karl Jansen-Winkeln, Das Ende des Neuen Reiches, Zeitschrift für Ägyptische Sprache und Altertumskunde ZÄS 119 (1992), 22-37
 Jennifer Palmer, The High Priests of Amun at the End of the Twentieth Dynasty, Birmingham Egyptology Journal 2014.2, 1-22
 V. Poláček, Quelques remarques sur les <<Procès Secrets>> en Ancienne Égypte, CdÉ 37 (1962), 23-30
 Ursula Rößler-Köhler, Piankh - Nedjemet - Anchefenmut - eine Kleinigkeit, GM 167 (1998), 7-8
 Ramadan El-Sayed, Piankh, Fils de Hérihor, BIFAO 78 (1978), 199-218
 John Taylor, Nodjmet, Payankh and Herihor: The end of the New Kingdom reconsidered, in Christopher J. Eyre (ed), Proceedings of the Seventh International Congress of Egyptologists'', Leuven 1998, 1143-1155
 Ad Thijs, Piankh's second Nubian campaign, GM 165 (1998), 99-103
 Ad Thijs, The Troubled Careers of Amenhotep and Panehsy: The High Priest of Amun and the Viceroy of Kush under the Last Ramessides, SAK 31 (2003), 289-306

11th-century BC clergy
Theban High Priests of Amun
Viceroys of Kush
People of the Twenty-first Dynasty of Egypt